Valentina Lanzieri (born 21 June 1984) is an Italian former footballer who played as a defender for Lazio.

International career
Lanzieri was also part of the Italian team at the 2005 European Championships.

References

External links

1984 births
Living people
Footballers from Rome
Torino Women A.S.D. players
S.S. Lazio Women 2015 players
Italian women's footballers
Italy women's international footballers
Serie A (women's football) players
Women's association football defenders